The San Diego Sockers were a soccer and indoor soccer team based in San Diego, California. The team played in the indoor and outdoor editions of the North American Soccer League (NASL) until 1984 as well as the original Major Indoor Soccer League and CISL. The franchise folded in 1996 and was the last surviving NASL franchise.

The Sockers are considered the most successful indoor soccer team. They made the playoffs in all but one of their 16 seasons of playing indoors.

History
The team began as the Baltimore Comets in 1974 but moved to San Diego as the San Diego Jaws in 1976. After a one-year stay in Las Vegas as the Las Vegas Quicksilvers, the team returned as the San Diego Sockers in 1978. They were owned by Bob Bell and played their indoor games at the San Diego Sports Arena.

Initially, victories came slowly for the club but mounted quickly and they experienced moderate success over their outdoor history winning several division titles.  However, the San Diego Sockers won the North American Soccer League (NASL) Indoor Championships of 1981–82 and 1983–84.
Success was far from over for the San Diego Sockers.  When the NASL folded, the San Diego Sockers moved to the Major Indoor Soccer League and won eight championships: 1983, 1985, 1986, 1988, 1989, 1990, 1991, and 1992.  The Sockers carried their success from one league to the next.  They switched to the Continental Indoor Soccer League for three more years from 1993 to 1995. However, after several ownership changes, Sockers folded after the 1996 season.

There have been two subsequent revivals of the Sockers.  The first was a franchise in the WISL that later joined the second MISL before folding in 2004.  A second started play in the PASL-PRO in 2009.

Leagues
 NASL 1974–1984
 NASL indoor 1980–1982, 1983–1984
 MISL/MSL 1982–1983, 1984–1992
 CISL 1993–1996

Owners
 Co-Owners included Charles T. Koval, Joe Sadowski, Ed Lewis, Bob Bell (1977–78)
 Co-Owners Charles T. Koval, Bob Bell (1978–81)
 Bob Bell (1981–87)
 Ron Fowler (1987–91)
 Oscar Ancira, Sr. (1991–94)
 San Diego Sports Arena Management (1994–96)

Head coaches
  Hubert Vogelsinger 1978–1980
  Ron Newman 1980–1994
   Brian Quinn (1994–96)

Year-by-year

Outdoor

Indoor

Honors

Championships (10)
 NASL indoor: 1981–82, 1983–84
 MISL: 1982–83, 1984–85, 1985–86, 1987–88, 1988–89, 1989–90, 1990–91, 1991–92
 CISL: 1993 (runners-up)

Regular Season/ Division Titles (12)
 NASL: 1978, 1981, 1984
 NASL indoor: 1981–82, 1983–84
 MISL: 1982–83, 1984–85, 1985–86, 1987–88, 1990–91, 1991–92
 CISL: 1996

Conference Titles
 NASL indoor: 1981–82 (Pacific)

NASL Coach of the Year
 1984 Ron Newman

NASL North American Player of the Year
 1981 Mike Stojanović

NASL All Stars
 1978 Alan Mayer -Second Team
 1979 Alan Mayer -Honorable Mention
 1979 Bobby Smith -Honorable Mention
 1981 Volkmar Gross -Honorable Mention
 1981 Mike Stojanović -Honorable Mention
 1981 Juli Veee -Honorable Mention
 1982 Juli Veee -Honorable Mention
 1983 Kaz Deyna -Second Team
 1984 Kevin Crow -First Team
 1984 Kaz Deyna -Honorable Mention
 1984 Brian Quinn -Honorable Mention

NASL indoor MVP
 1981–82 Juli Veee

NASL indoor Scoring Champion
 1981–82 Juli Veee

NASL indoor Goalkeeper of the Year
 1983–84 Jim Gorsek

NASL indoor Championship Finals MVP
 1981–82 Juli Veee
 1983–84 Jean Willrich

NASL indoor All Stars
 1980–81 Julie Veee
 1981–82 Julie Veee
 1981–82 Martin Donnelly
 1981–82 Volkmar Gross
 1983–84 Kaz Deyna, Gert Wieczorkowski
 1983–84 (2nd team) Juli Veee, Martin Donnelly
 1984 Alan Mayer -All-Star Game starter
 1984 Julie Veee -All-Star Game starter
 1984 Kaz Deyna -All-Star Game starter
 1984 Jean Willrich -All-Star Game reserve
 1984 Gert Wieczorkowski -All-Star Game reserve

Hall of Fame members
 United States: Fernando Clavijo, Ron Newman, Hugo Pérez, Bobby Smith, Alan Willey
 Canada: Bob Iarusci, Terry Moore, Branko Šegota, Mike Stojanović
 Indoor Soccer: Fernando Clavijo, Kevin Crow, Zoran Karić, Alan Mayer, Ron Newman, Victor Nogueira, Brian Quinn, Branko Šegota, Zoltán Tóth, Julie Veee, Steve Zungul

MISL MVP
 1983 Alan Mayer
 1985 Steve Zungul
 1986 Steve Zungul
 1991 Victor Nogueira
 1992 Victor Nogueira

MISL Championship MVP
 1983 Juli Veee
 1985 Steve Zungul
 1986 Brian Quinn
 1988 Hugo Pérez
 1989 Victor Nogueira
 1990 Brian Quinn
 1991 Ben Collins
 1992 Thompson Usiyan

MISL Scoring Champion
 1985 Steve Zungul
 1986 Steve Zungul

MISL Pass Master (Assists leader)
 1985 Steve Zungul
 1986 Steve Zungul

MISL Defender of the Year
 1985 Kevin Crow
 1988 Kevin Crow
 1989 Kevin Crow
 1991 Kevin Crow
 1992 Kevin Crow

MISL Goalkeeper of the Year
 1988 Zoltán Tóth
 1989 Victor Nogueira
 1991 Victor Nogueira
 1992 Victor Nogueira

MISL Coach of the Year
 1988 Ron Newman

MISL Rookie of the Year
 1991 David Banks

MISL First Team All Star
 1983 Alan Mayer, Kazimierz Deyna
 1985 Branko Šegota, Kevin Crow, Steve Zungul
 1986 Fernando Clavijo, Branko Segota
 1987 Kevin Crow
 1988 Zoltán Tóth, Fernando Clavijo, Kevin Crow, Branko Segota
 1990 Victor Nogueira, Kevin Crow
 1991 Victor Nogueira, Kevin Crow

CISL Goalkeeper of the Year
 1994 Antonio Cortes

CISL Rookie of the Year
 1994 John Olu–Molomo
 1995 Mark Chung
 1996 Carlos Farias

CISL First Team All Star
 1993 David Banks
 1995 Mark Chung

Sources
 [when accessed on February 15, 2020, this link was no longer active]

References

San Diego Sockers 1978
Defunct soccer clubs in California
Soccer clubs in California
Defunct indoor soccer clubs in the United States
North American Soccer League (1968–1984) teams
Major Indoor Soccer League (1978–1992) teams
Continental Indoor Soccer League teams
1978 establishments in California
1996 disestablishments in California
Association football clubs established in 1978
Association football clubs disestablished in 1996